Yanaizu may refer to:

 Yanaizu, Fukushima, a town in Fukushima Prefecture, Japan
 Yanaizu, Gifu, a former town in Gifu Prefecture, Japan

See also
 Yanaizu Station (disambiguation)
 Yanaizu Dam, a gravity dam on the Tadami River, Fukushima Prefecture, Japan